The 1943 Colgate Red Raiders football team was an American football team that represented Colgate University as an independent during the 1943 college football season. In its 15th season under head coach Andrew Kerr, the team compiled a 5–3–1 record and outscored opponents by a total of 128 to 91. Michael Micka and George Thomas were the team captains. The team played its home games at Colgate Athletic Field in Hamilton, New York.

Schedule

References

Colgate
Colgate Raiders football seasons
Colgate Red Raiders football